Jason Oosthuizen (born 5 May 1999) is a South African cyclist, who currently rides for French amateur team CR4C Roanne.

Major results

Road

2016
 2nd Time trial, National Junior Road Championships
2017
 National Junior Road Championships
1st  Road race
1st  Time trial
2018
 1st  Road race, National Under-23 Road Championships
 6th Overall Tour de Limpopo
2019
 1st  Team time trial, African Games
 1st Stage 2 Challenge International du Sahara Marocain
 Les Challenges de la Marche Verte
1st GP Oued Eddahab
9th GP Al Massira
 2nd Overall Tour of Good Hope
 7th Overall Tour de Limpopo
 7th 100 Cycle Challenge
2021
 1st  Team time trial, African Road Championships

Track

2016
 National Junior Track Championships
1st  Individual pursuit
1st  Team pursuit (with Rennie Anthony, Jacques Van Niekerk and Joshua van Wyk)
1st  Kilo
2017
 African Junior Track Championships
1st  Kilo
1st  Individual pursuit
3rd  Omnium
 National Junior Track Championships
1st  Points race
1st  Scratch
1st  Keirin
1st  Elimination race

References

External links
 
 

1999 births
Living people
South African male cyclists
People from Krugersdorp
African Games gold medalists for South Africa
African Games medalists in cycling
Competitors at the 2019 African Games
Sportspeople from Gauteng
20th-century South African people
21st-century South African people